The Posadas–Encarnación International Train is a  commuter rail international service operated between Posadas in Argentina and Encarnación in Paraguay, running on the Urquiza Railway standard gauge tracks. The service was opened in January 2014.

Overview 
Trains are run by private company Casimiro Zbikoski S.A. under an operation agreement with State-owned Operadora Ferroviaria Sociedad del Estado (SOFSE). The train crosses the San Roque González de Santa Cruz Bridge which joins the two countries together and has an average journey time of 10 minutes with a 30-minute frequency.

The current rolling stock consists of two-carriage diesel-hydraulic railcars originally called "Wadloper", built between 1981 and 1983 by German company Duewag for the Dutch railway company Nederlandse Spoorwegen, and have a capacity to carry 250 people. Those railcars had been previously used in the binational service Tren de los Pueblos Libres that joined Argentina and Uruguay, having been active only for one year. 

With passenger numbers increasing rapidly after the opening of the service, the Argentine Ministry of the Interior and Transport stated in March 2015 that it may have to evaluate adding more rolling stock and extending the length of the platforms.

In August 2015, the service was suspended for an unspecified period of time, with no reasons given from both, the concessionaire –Casimiro Zbikoski– and Trenes Argentinos. At the time of the service being suspended, the train had carried 250,000 people within the year. On the other hand, the Government of Paraguay stated that they had no objections to anything related to the service, blaming the Argentine authorities for the suspension of the train. Other versions affirmed that the service could be reestablished the second week in September. On 7 September, service resumed as normal, though the three-week interruption had not been explained.

See also
 General Urquiza Railway
 Rail transport in Argentina
 Rail transport in Paraguay

References

External links

Railway services introduced in 2014
Railway lines in Argentina
Rail transport in Paraguay
International named passenger trains
International railway lines
Posadas, Misiones
Transport in Misiones Province